Georges Dancigers (17 February 1908 Tukums, Russian Empire(now Latvia) – 1 November 1993 Neuilly-sur-Seine, France) was a Russian Empire-born, French film producer. His most notable film was Bertrand Blier's Get out your Handkerchief (1978), which won the Academy Award for Best Foreign Language Film. He was awarded an Honorary César award in 1982.

Selected filmography
 The Cupid Club (1949)
 The Cape of Hope (1951)
 Madame du Barry (1954)

External links

1908 births
1993 deaths
French film producers
César Honorary Award recipients
Emigrants from the Russian Empire to France